Muradxanlı is a village in the Qubadli District of Azerbaijan.

History 
The village was located in the Armenian-occupied territories surrounding Nagorno-Karabakh, coming under the control of ethnic Armenian forces during the First Nagorno-Karabakh War in the early 1990s. The village subsequently became part of the breakaway Republic of Artsakh as part of its Kashatagh Province, referred to as Hakari. It was recaptured by the Azerbaijani Army on 2 November 2020 during the Lachin offensive.

Historical heritage sites 
Historical heritage sites in and around the village include the fortress of Karnakash (also Ghalali), two reservoirs, and a defensive wall from between the 11th and 14th centuries, as well as the 14th-century khachkar of Hakari.

Demographics 
The village had 126 inhabitants in 2005, and 119 inhabitants in 2015.

References

External links 
 

Populated places in Qubadli District